Rush TV is a 2009 Australian television show which focuses on music, fashion and sports. The show is produced by the Australian Broadcasting Company for their then new channel ABC3. The show features two main hosts Hannah Wang and Mitchell Tomlinson.

Format 
Hannah Wang and Mitchell Tomlinson reports on different sporting events and explores the fusion between sport and music, fashion and the arts. She interviews the athletes as they share their tips, favourite sporting locations and 'inside' information. They also report on the latest in action sports.

Production 
The show was announced as a local sports show to the new children's channel ABC3. Auditions for the show were held online called Me On ABC3.Over 5000 auditions were sent in and six hosting roles were announced. The Rush TV hosts were announced as Hannah Wang and Mitchell Tomlinson.

See also 
Studio 3 (TV Show)
ABC3

References 

Australian Broadcasting Corporation original programming
2009 Australian television series debuts
Television shows set in Australia